Odyssey III is an abstract 1973 painted aluminum sculpture by Tony Rosenthal, installed outside the San Diego Museum of Art in San Diego's Balboa Park, in the U.S. state of California.

Description
The San Diego Union-Tribune described the work as a "riotous orangey-red-painted assembly of aluminum discs".

History
The Rosenthal sculpture was purchased by the San Diego Museum of Art in 1974 with matching funds from the National Endowment for the Arts.

Since 2016, Tony Rosenthal "Odyssey III", 1973 has been included in "Art of the Open Air", an exhibition open to the public without admission charge of public art owned by the San Diego Museum of Art.

See also

 1973 in art

References

1973 sculptures
Abstract sculptures in California
Aluminum sculptures in California
Outdoor sculptures in San Diego
Sculptures of the San Diego Museum of Art
Sculptures by Tony Rosenthal